'De första åren' (English: The Early Years) is a box set  by Swedish pop singer and ABBA member Agnetha Fältskog, released in 2004.

It included all her official recordings between 1967-1979, except the TV specials recordings and her 16 recordings in German for which the master tapes are considered lost.

Track listing

CD 1: Agnetha Fältskog (1968)
" Jag var så kär    3:18 
"  Jag har förlorat dej    3:25 
"  Utan dej mitt liv går vidare    2:47 
"  Allting har förändrat sej    3:10 
"  Försonade    2:57 
"  Slutet gott allting gott    1:43 
"  Tack Sverige    3:00 
"  En sommar med dej    3:20 
"  Snövit och de sju dvärgarna    3:07 
"  Min farbror Jonathan    2:31 
"  Följ med mig    1:35 
"  Den jag väntat på    2:24

CD 2: Agnetha Fältskog Vol. 2 (1969)
"  Fram för svenska sommaren    2:26 
"  Lek med dina dockor    2:15 
"  Ge dej till tåls    2:25 
"  Skål kära vän    2:05 
"  Glöm honom    2:15 
"  En gång fanns bara vi två    2:41 
"  Hjärtats kronprins    2:35 
"  Det handlar om kärlek    2:26 
"  Som en vind kom du till mig    3:24 
"  Señor Gonzales    2:28 
"  Zigenarvän    2:54 
"  Tag min hand låt oss bli vänner    2:14

CD 3: Som jag är (1970)
"  Som ett eko    3:09 
"  När jag var fem    3:08 
"  En sång och en saga    3:35 
"  Tänk va' skönt    3:21 
"  Ta det bara met ro    2:10 
"  Om tårar vore guld    3:27 
"  Hjärtats saga    2:18 
"  Spela vår sång    2:18 
"  Agnetha Fältskog med Björn Ulvaeus – Så här börjar kärlek    2:31 
"  Du ska minnas mig    3:11 
"  Jag ska göra allt    3:46 
"  Sov gott min lilla vän    2:44

CD 4: När en vacker tanke blir en sång (1971)
"  Många gånger än    2:35 
"  Jag vill att du skall bli lyckig    3:05 
"  Kungens vaktparad    2:40 
"  Mitt sommarland    2:23 
"  Nya ord    2:13 
"  Jag skall inte fälla några tårar    1:59 
"  Då finns du hos mig    2:30 
"  Han lämnar mig för att komma till dig    3:03 
"  Kanske var min kind lite het    3:07 
"  Sången föder dig tillbaka    3:13 
"  Tågen kan gå igen    3:06 
"  Dröm är dröm, och saga saga    3:25

CD 5: Elva kvinnor i ett hus (1975)
"  S.O.S.    3:23 
"  En egen trädgård    2:35 
"  Tack för en underbar, vanlig dag    2:39 
"  Gulleplutt    2:56 
"  Är du som han?    2:50 
"  Och han väntar på mej    3:03 
"  Doktorn!    2:51 
"  Mina ögon    3:04 
"  Dom har glömt    3:49 
"  Var det med dej?    3:39 
"  Visa i åttonde månaden    3:57

CD 6 (bonus cd)
"  När du tar mej i din famn  (A. Fältskog/Ingela "Pling" Forsman) 4:07 
"  Tio mil kvar till Korpilombolo  (A. Fältskog/B.Ulvaeus/P.Himmelstrand) 3:00 
"  Vart ska min kärlek föra  (Andrew Lloyd Webber/Tim Rice/Britt G Hallqvist) 3:20 
"  En sång om sorg och glädje  (Mario Capuano/Giosy Capuano/Mike Shepstone/S. Anderson) 3:45 
"  Någonting händer med mej  (Alan Moorehouse/Bo-Göran Edling) (with Jörgen Edman) 2:35 
"  Litet solskenbarn (Peter Howlett Smith/Karl Gerhard Lundkvist) (B.side of 'Om tårar vore guld') 3:10 
"  Så glad som dina ögon (A. Fältskog/Kenneth Gärdestad) (B.side of 'Tio mil kvar till Korpilombolo') 3:00 
"  Nu ska du bli stilla  (Andrew Lloyd Webber/Tim Rice/Britt G Hallqvist) 3:48 
"  Sjung denna sång  (Sonny Bono/Charles Greene/Brian Stone/A. Fältskog) (with Jörgen Edman) 2:40 
"  Vi har hunnit fram till refängen (Neil Sedaka/Howard Greenfield/S. Anderson) 4:06 
"  Here For Your Love  (A. Fältskog/Bosse Carlgren) 2:54 
"  Golliwog  (A. Fältskog/Bosse Carlgren) 2:55 
"  The Queen Of Hearts  (A. Fältskog/Ingela "Pling" Forsman) 3:20 
"  Det var så här det började  (Intervjuer och radioinslag)  4:58 
"  Borsta tandtrollen bort  1:52

Nu ska du bli stilla &  Vart ska min kärlek föra are reworked studio versions of Jesus Christ Superstar (Swedish version 1972) stage versions for release as single.

Sources
 Booklet, Agnetha Fältskog: De Första Åren – 1967-1979
Jeffrey de Hart, research and liner notes; translation and research assistance: Peter Palmquist, Claes Davidsson, Mattias Olsson & Krister Henriksson; additional research: Frank Axelsson, Ulf Henningsson, Helga van de Kar, Anita Notenboom & Björn Waldenström

References

ABBF record service,
elmar abba site,
abba the albums
https://web.archive.org/web/20100210202925/http://www.agnetha.net/AGNETHA.html

Agnetha Fältskog compilation albums
2004 compilation albums